Kweon Seong-dong (Korean: 권성동, born 29 April 1960) is a South Korean lawyer and politician. A member of the conservative People Power Party (PPP), he has been the Member of Parliament for Gangneung since 2009.

Before entering politics, Kweon worked as a prosecutor and lawyer at various prosecution offices and the Ministry of Justice. He made his political debut at the 2009 Gangneung by-election which he won with about 51% of popular votes. He made himself known through his role at the 2016 political scandal, which let the impeachment of Park Geun-hye.

Early life and education 
Kweon was born in Gangneung, Gangwon in 1960. He is the eldest of the three sons and a daughter of a housewife and Kweon Seung-ohk (died in 2022), was an educator and the former Director of Gangneung Myeongryun Institution. He attended Gangneung Myeongryun High School before joining Chung-Ang University, where he studied law.

Career 
Although Kweon had ever joined anti-dictatorship movements in 1980, he rather prepared for a bar as he did not agree with "radical changes". He was qualified for the bar in 1985.

Shortly after completing national service, he began his prosecutor career at Suwon District Prosecutor's Office in March 1991, where he worked till transferred to Gangneung branch of Chuncheon District Public Prosecutors Office in September 1993. He then moved to Seoul, where he worked at Seoul Central District Prosecutors' Office, the Ministry of Justice, Seoul Eastern District Prosecutors' Offices, and the Supreme Prosecutors' Office, between 1994 and 2000, and again between 2003 and 2005. His prosecutor career came to the end at Gwangju High Prosecutor's Office in 2006. He then briefly worked as a lawyer at Sojong Partners.

While he was working at the Ministry of Justice in 1999, Kweon made a draft of the National Human Rights Commission Act that was later submitted to the National Assembly. The bill was, however, scrapped by the then ruling party, Millennium Democratic Party (MDP), who instead established the National Human Rights Commission based on the demand of left-leaning non-governmental organisations (NGO). This made him to join politics.

Politics 
In the 2008 election, Kweon made an unsuccessful attempt to contest for Gangneung under the Grand National Party (GNP) banner.

On 8 April 2022, Kweon was elected parliamentary leader of the People Power Party, defeating Cho Hae-jin.

Political views

Controversies

Personal life

Election results

General elections

References

External links 
 Official website
 Kweon Seong-dong on Facebook

1960 births
Living people
People from Gangneung
South Korean politicians
South Korean prosecutors
20th-century South Korean lawyers
21st-century South Korean lawyers